The Boko Haram insurgency began in July 2009, when the militant Islamist and jihadist rebel group Boko Haram started an armed rebellion against the government of Nigeria. The conflict is taking place within the context of long-standing issues of religious violence between Nigeria's Muslim and Christian communities, and the insurgents' ultimate aim is to establish an Islamic state in the region.

Boko Haram's initial uprising failed, and its leader Mohammed Yusuf was killed by the Nigerian government.  He began the group in the year 2002, with a view of opposing western education with his followers. He was arrested at his parent's inlaws house by the Nigerian Military and subsequently handed over to the Nigerian police. He was survived by four wives and 12 children one of which was Abu Musab al-Barnawi  who in the year 2016 wanted to lead the group. The movement consequently fractured into autonomous groups and started an insurgency, though rebel commander Abubakar Shekau managed to achieve a kind of primacy among the insurgents. Though challenged by internal rivals, such as Abu Usmatul al-Ansari's Salafist conservative faction and the Ansaru faction, Shekau became the insurgency's de facto leader and mostly kept the different Boko Haram factions from fighting each other, instead focusing on overthrowing the Nigerian government. Supported by other jihadist organizations including al-Qaeda and al-Shabaab, Shekau's tactics were marked by extreme brutality and explicit targeting of civilians.

After years of fighting, the insurgents became increasingly aggressive and began to seize large areas in northeastern Nigeria. The violence escalated dramatically in 2014 with 10,849 deaths, while Boko Haram drastically expanded its territories. At the same time, the insurgency spread to neighboring Cameroon, Chad, Mali, and Niger, thus becoming a major regional conflict in Sub-Saharan Africa. Meanwhile, Shekau attempted to improve his international standing among jihadists by tacitly aligning with the Islamic State of Iraq and the Levant in March 2015, with Boko Haram becoming the "Islamic State's West Africa Province" (ISWAP).

The insurgents were driven back during the 2015 West African offensive by a Nigeria-led coalition of African and Western countries, forcing the Islamists to retreat into Sambisa Forest and bases at Lake Chad. Discontent about various issues consequently grew among Boko Haram. Dissidents among the movement allied themselves with IS' central command and challenged Shekau's leadership, resulting in a violent split of the insurgents. Since then, Shekau and his group are generally referred to as "Boko Haram", whereas the dissidents continued to operate as ISWAP under Abu Musab al-Barnawi. The two factions consequently fought against each other while waging insurgencies against the local governments. After a period of reversals, Boko Haram and ISWAP launched new offensives in 2018 and 2019, again growing in strength.

When Boko Haram's insurgency was at its peak in the mid-2010s, it was the world's deadliest terrorist organization, in terms of the number of people it killed. In a bid to ensure dialog between government and the deadly sect, the President Jonathan administration set up a committee to grant an amnesty to the Boko Haram sect. Some details of the amnesty includes granting of pardons to Boko Haram fighters and also listening to clamour from different ethnic groups under the sect with a bid to ending the violence perpetrated by the deadly sect. This amnesty was rejected by the sect in an audio broadcast that was sent by its leader on the grounds that they are fighting to create an Islamic state in Nigeria's predominantly Muslim north and that it is the government that is committing atrocities against Muslims.

In May 2021 ISWAP attacked and overran Boko Haram militants in the Sambisa Forest and the leader of Boko Haram Abubakar Shekau was killed during the fighting, reportedly using a suicide vest. In August Abu Musab al-Barnawi, the leading commander of ISWAP, was killed. Different reports of his death circulated, alleging that he had either been killed by the Nigerian Army or as a result of inter-ISWAP power struggles.

After Shekau's death masses of Boko Haram militants surrendered while others defected to ISWAP. According to the Nigerian Defence Forces, as of April 5, a total of 51,114 rebels and families, consisting of 11,398 men, 15,381 women, and 24,335 children, have surrendered.

Abubakar Sarki a top Boko Haram leader was killed in the Sambisa Forest in May 2022. In a battle of supremacy 
Sarki was leading a military convoy to Abu-Ubaida’s ISWAP camp, but they were intercepted by the Nigerian army. Sarki and some of his fighters escaped but ran onto another batch of soldiers where he met his demise.

The radical preacher and leader of Jamā’at Ahl as-Sunnah lid-Da’wah wa’l-Jihād, a Boko Haram splinter group, Alhaji Ari-Difinoma, has surrendered to troops of the Nigerian Army on May 16, 2022.

Background

Nigerian statehood
Nigeria amalgamated both the Northern and Southern protectorate in 1914, about a decade after the defeat of the Sokoto Caliphate and other Islamic states by the British which were to constitute much of Northern Nigeria. Sir Frederick Lugard assumed office as governor of both protectorates in 1912. The aftermath of the First World War saw Germany lose its colonies, one of which was Cameroon, to French, Belgian and British mandates. Cameroon was divided in French and British parts, the latter of which was further subdivided into southern and northern parts. Following a plebiscite in 1961, the Southern Cameroons elected to rejoin French Cameroon, while the Northern Cameroons opted to join Nigeria, a move which added to Nigeria's already large Northern Muslim population. The territory made up much of what is now Northeastern Nigeria, and a large part of the areas affected by the insurgency.

Early religious conflict in Nigeria

Religious conflict in Nigeria dates as far back as 1953. The Igbo massacre of 1966 in the North that followed the counter-coup of the same year had as a dual cause the Igbo officers' coup and pre-existing (sectarian) tensions between the Igbos and the local Muslims. This was a major factor in the Biafran secession and the resulting civil war.

Maitatsine

In the late 1970s and early 1980s, there was a major Islamic uprising led by Maitatsine (Mohammed Marwa) and his followers, Yan Tatsine that led to several thousand deaths. After Maitatsine's death in 1980, the movement continued some five years more.

In the same decade the erstwhile military ruler of Nigeria, General Ibrahim Babangida enrolled Nigeria in the Organisation of the Islamic Conference. This was a move which aggravated religious tensions in the country, particularly among the Christian community. In response, some in the Muslim community pointed out that certain other African member states have smaller proportions of Muslims, as well as Nigeria's diplomatic relations with the Holy See.

Establishment of Sharia

Since the return of democracy to Nigeria in 1999, Sharia has been instituted as a main body of civil and criminal law in 9 Muslim-majority and in some parts of 3 Muslim-plurality states, when then-Zamfara State governor Ahmad Rufai Sani began the push for the institution of Sharia at the state level of government. This was followed by controversy as to the would-be legal status of the non-Muslims in the Sharia system. A spate of Muslim-Christian riots soon emerged.

In the primarily Islamic northern states of Nigeria, a variety of Muslim groups and populations exist, who favour the nationwide introduction of Sharia Law. The demands of these populations have been at least partially upheld by the Nigerian Federal Government in 12 states, firstly in Zamfara State in 1999. The implementation has been widely attributed as being due to the insistence of Zamfara State governor Ahmad Rufai Sani.

The death sentences of Amina Lawal and Safiya Hussaini attracted international attention to what many saw as the harsh regime of these laws. These sentences were later overturned; the first execution was carried out in 2002.

Blasphemy and apostasy

Twelve out of Nigeria's thirty-six states have Sunni Islam as the dominant religion. In 1999, those states chose to have Sharia courts as well as Customary courts. A Sharia court may treat blasphemy as deserving of several punishments up to, and including, execution. In many predominantly Muslim states, conversion from Islam to another religion is illegal and often a capital offence.

Demographic balance
According to a Nigerian study on demographics and religion, Muslims make up 50.5% of the population. Muslims mainly live in the north of the country; the majority of Nigerian Muslims are Sunnis. Christians are the second-largest religious group and make up 48.2% of the population. They predominate in the central and southern parts of the country.

For reasons of avoiding political controversy, questions of religion were forgone in the 2006 Nigerian census.

History

2009 Boko Haram uprising

Boko Haram conducted its operations more or less peacefully during the first seven years of its existence. That changed in 2009 when the Nigerian government launched an investigation into the group's activities following reports that its members were arming themselves. Prior to that the government reportedly repeatedly ignored warnings about the increasingly militant character of the organisation, including that of a military officer.

When the government came into action, several members of the group were arrested in Bauchi, sparking deadly clashes with Nigerian security forces in Bauchi, Maiduguri in Borno State, Potiskum in Yobe State and Wudil in Kano State – which led to the deaths of an estimated 700 people. During the fighting with the security forces Boko Haram fighters reportedly "used fuel-laden motorcycles" and "bows with poison arrows" to attack a police station. The group's founder and then leader Mohammed Yusuf was also killed during this time while still in police custody. After Yusuf's killing, Abubakar Shekau became the leader and held this position in January 2015.

2010 resurgence
Nearly six months after the killing of Yusuf, the group carried out its first terrorist attack in Borno in January, killing four people. During the following few years, the violence escalated in terms of both frequency and intensity. On 7 September, a prison break in Bauchi freed more than 700 Boko Haram militants, replenishing their force. On 24 December, Boko Haram used four bombs to kill 32 people in Jos, Plateau State. On the same day, they killed six people in attacks against churches in Maiduguri.

2011
On 29 May, a few hours after Goodluck Jonathan was sworn in as president, several bombings purportedly by Boko Haram killed 15 and injured 55. On 16 June, Boko Haram claimed responsibility for the Abuja police headquarters bombing, the first known suicide attack in Nigeria. Two months later the United Nations building in Abuja was bombed, signifying the first time that Boko Haram attacked an international organisation. On 4 November, it carried out attacks in Damaturu in Yobe and in Maiduguri, killing over a hundred people, and on 22 and 23 December clashing with security forces, resulting in at least 68 deaths. On 25 December, Boko Haram attacked several churches with bombings and shootings.

15 June marked the start of a Federal Government-sanctioned military effort to counter the growing threat of Boko Haram's insurgency. With 21 Armoured Brigade (21 Bde) of the Nigerian Army as its nucleus, Joint Task Force Operation Restore Order (JTF ORO 1) marked the start of the Army's lengthy counter-insurgency (COIN) campaign against Boko Haram. The campaign has gone through several phases and has greatly escalated in scale, capacity, components and stakeholders, since that time. Results, however, have sometimes been mixed and the Army has been criticised for being too kinetic in its COIN.

2012
In January in Nigeria, Boko Haram attacked Mubi, Yola and Gombi – all in Adamawa State – in addition to Maiduguri and Kano. During the same month, Abubakar Shekau, a former deputy to Yusuf, appeared in a video posted on YouTube. According to Reuters, Shekau took control of the group after Yusuf's death in 2009. Authorities had previously believed that Shekau died during the 2009 uprising. By early 2012, the group was responsible for over 900 deaths. On 8 March, a small Special Boat Service team and the Nigerian Army attempted to rescue two hostages, Briton Chris McManus and Italian Franco Lamolinara, being held in Sokoto, by members of the Boko Haram terrorist organisation loyal to al-Qaeda. Both hostages were killed by their captors before or during the rescue attempt. All the hostage takers were reportedly killed. On 8 April, at least 38 people were killed by a suicide car bomber in Kaduna. On 24 June, about 40 inmates escaped during a prison break in Damaturu. On 17 June, at least 12 people were killed by three bombings of churches in Kaduna State. On 7 August, 19 people were killed in a mass shooting in Kogi State. On 1–2 November, at least 25 men were killed at the Federal Polytechnic, Mubi. On 25 December, six people were killed in Potiskum and another six in Maiduguri. On 28 December, fifteen people were killed in a village in northeastern Nigeria.

2013

Government offensive

In May, Nigerian government forces launched an offensive in the Borno region in an attempt to dislodge Boko Haram fighters after a state of emergency was called on 14 May. The state of emergency – which was still in force in May 2014 – applied to the states of Borno, Yobe, and Adamawa in northeastern Nigeria. The offensive had initial success, but the Boko Haram rebels were able to regain their strength.

Attacks
On 8 February, gunmen killed at least nine polio vaccinators in Kano. On 18 March, a suicide car bomber rammed a bus in Kano, killing over 20 people. On 16 and 17 April, dozens of civilians were killed during a battle in Baga, Borno, between Boko Haram and the Nigerian Army. On 6 July, Boko Haram massacred 42 students in Yobe, bringing the school year to an early end in the state. On 5 August, Boko Haram launched dual attacks on Bama and Malam Fatori, leaving 35 dead. On 11 August, Boko Haram killed 44 people in a mass shooting at a mosque in Konduga, Borno. On 6 October, the Nigerian Army won a battle against Boko Haram in Damboa, Borno. On 2 November in Borno, gunmen attacked a convoy returning from a wedding, killing over 30 people.

2014

Chibok kidnapping and ambush
On 15 April, Boko Haram terrorists abducted about 276 teenage female pupils from a secondary school in Chibok in Borno. The abduction was widely attributed to Boko Haram. It was reported that the group had taken the girls to neighbouring Cameroon and Chad where they were to be sold into marriages at a price below a dollar each. The abduction of another eight girls was reported later. These kidnappings raised public protests, with some protesters holding placards bearing the Twitter tag #BringBackOurGirls, which had caught international attention. The Guardian reported that the British Royal Air Force conducted Operation Turus in Nigeria in April in response to the Chibok kidnapping. A source involved with the operation told The Observer that "The girls were located in the first few weeks of the RAF mission", and that "We [RAF] offered to rescue them, but the Nigerian government declined", this was because it viewed any action to be taken as a "national issue", and for it to be resolved by Nigerian intelligence and security services, the source added that the girls were then tracked by the aircraft as they were dispersed into progressively smaller groups over the following months. Several countries pledged support to the Nigerian government and to help their military with intelligence gathering on the whereabouts of the girls and the operational camps of Boko Haram.

On 13–14 May, Boko Haram ambushed Nigerian soldiers who were searching for the kidnapped girls.

Jos bombings
On 20 May, two bombs in the city of Jos, Plateau State, Nigeria, were detonated, killing at least 118 people and injuring more than 56 others. The bombs exploded 30 minutes apart, one at a local market place at approximately 3:00 and the second in a parking lot next to a hospital at approximately 3:30, where rescuers responding to the first accident were killed. Though no group or individual has claimed responsibility, the attacks have been attributed to Boko Haram.

First responders were unable to reach the scenes of the accidents, as "thousands of people were fleeing the scene in the opposite direction". The bombs had been positioned to kill as many people as possible, regardless of religion, which differed from previous attacks in which non-Muslims were targeted. The bombers were reported to have used a "back-to-back blast" tactic, in which an initial bomb explodes at a central location and another explodes a short time later with intent to kill people working to rescuing the wounded.

Maiduguri bombings
In 2014, Boko Haram militants increased their attacks on cities and towns in northern Nigeria and captured part of the country's northeast. These attacks included bombings in Maiduguri in January, July and November.

Escalation in fighting

The increasing intensity of the insurgency prompted the Nigerian government to launch an offensive, and with the help of Chad, Niger, and Cameroon, they recaptured many areas that were formerly under the control of Boko Haram.

In late 2014, Boko Haram seized control of Bama, Borno, according to the town's residents. In December, it was reported that "people too elderly to flee Gwoza Local Government Area were being rounded up and taken to two schools where the militants opened fire on them." Over 50 elderly people in Bama were killed. A "gory" video was released of insurgents shooting over a hundred civilians in a school dormitory in the town of Bama.

2015

Baga massacre
Between 3 and 7 January, Boko Haram attacked the town of Baga and killed up to 2,000 people, perhaps the largest massacre by Boko Haram.

Maiduguri bombing
On 10 January, 19 people were killed in a suicide bombing at a market in Maiduguri. The city is at the heart of the Boko Haram insurgency. On 12 January, Boko Haram carried out an unsuccessful attack on a Chadian Army base.

Counter-offensive against Boko Haram

On 23 January, a coalition of military forces from Nigeria, Chad, Cameroon, and Niger began a counter-insurgency campaign against Boko Haram. In the early hours of 25 January, Boko Haram launched a major assault on the city. On 26 January, CNN reported that the attack on Maiduguri by "hundreds of gunmen" had been repelled, but the nearby town of Monguno was captured by Boko Haram. The Nigerian Army said they repelled another attack on Maiduguri on 31 January.

On 4 February, the Chad Army killed over 200 Boko Haram militants. On 4 and 5 February, Boko Haram carried out a massacre in Fotokol, Far North Region, Cameroon, killing 81 civilians, 13 Chadian soldiers and 6 Cameroonian soldiers. On 6 February, Boko Haram attacked Bosso and Diffa in Niger. On 15 February, a suicide bombing occurred in Damaturu. On 17 February, the Nigerian military retook Monguno in a coordinated air and ground assault. On 22 February, a suicide bombing occurred in Potiskum. On 24 February, suicide bombings occurred in Potiskum and Kano. On 2 March, the Nigerian Armed Forces defeated Boko Haram in the Battle of Konduga.

On 7 March, Boko Haram's leader Abubakar Shekau pledged allegiance to the Islamic State of Iraq and the Levant (ISIL) via an audio message posted on the organisation's Twitter account. Nigerian Army spokesperson Sami Usman Kukasheka said the pledge was a sign of weakness and that Shekau was like a "drowning man". That same day, five suicide bomb blasts left 54 dead and 143 wounded. On 12 March, ISIL's spokesman Abu Mohammad al-Adnani released an audiotape in which he welcomed the pledge of allegiance, and described it as an expansion of the group's caliphate to West Africa.

Following its declaration of loyalty to ISIL, Boko Haram was designated as the group's "West Africa Province" (Islamic State West Africa Province, or ISWAP) while Shekau was appointed as its first vali (governor). Furthermore, ISIL started to support Boko Haram, but also began to interfere in its internal matters. For example, ISIL's central leadership attempted to reduce Boko Haram's brutality toward civilians and internal critics, as Shekau's ideology was "too extreme even for the Islamic State".

On 24 March, residents of Damasak, Borno, said that Boko Haram had taken more than 400 women and children from the town as they fled from coalition forces who retook the area and found a mass grave of Boko Haram victims. On 27 March, the Nigerian army captured Gwoza, which was believed to be the location of Boko Haram headquarters. On election day, 28 March, Boko Haram extremists killed 41 people, including a legislator, to discourage hundreds from voting.

In March, Boko Haram lost control of the Borno towns of Bama and Gwoza (believed to be their headquarters) to the Nigerian Army. The Nigerian authorities said that they had taken back 11 of the 14 districts previously controlled by Boko Haram. In April, four Boko Haram camps in the Sambisa Forest were overrun by the Nigerian military who freed nearly 300 females. Boko Haram forces were believed to have retreated to the Mandara Mountains, along the Cameroon–Nigeria border. On 16 March, the Nigerian Army said that it had recaptured Bama. On 27 March, the day before the Nigerian presidential election, the Nigerian Army announced that it had recaptured the town of Gwoza from Boko Haram.

By April, the Nigerian military was reported to have retaken most of the areas previously controlled by Boko Haram in Northeastern Nigeria, except for Sambisa Forest in Borno.

In May, the Nigerian military announced that they had released about 700 women from camps in Sambisa Forest.

On 12 July, two female suicide bombers wearing burqas killed 13 people in Fotokol. In response, the governor of Cameroon's Far North banned the Islamic veil and burqa.

In August, it was reported that over a thousand deaths had occurred since the inauguration of the new administration.

On 10 October, suicide bombers attacked a market and refugee camp in Baga Sola, Lac, Chad.

On 28 October, it was announced that Nigerian troops had rescued 338 people from Boko Haram near the group's Sambisa Forest stronghold. Of those rescued, 192 were children and 138 were women.

In December, Muhammadu Buhari, the President of Nigeria, claimed that Boko Haram was "technically defeated" and it was reported that 1,000 women had been rescued from Boko Haram in January 2016. On 5 December, four female suicide bombers attacked a market on the Chadian side of Lake Chad. On 28 December, female suicide bombers killed over 55 people in Madagali in Adamawa and Maiduguri.

American military support
In early October 2015, the United States military deployed 300 troops to Cameroon, with the approval of the Cameroonian government, with the primary mission of providing intelligence support to local forces, and conducting reconnaissance flights.

The troops also oversaw a program to transfer American military vehicles to the Cameroonian Army to aid in their fight against Islamist militants.

As of May 2016, U.S. personnel were involved in drone operations from Garoua, Far North Region, Cameroon, to help provide intelligence in the region to assist local forces. There were additional drone operations based out of Niger. U.S. Army soldiers in Cameroon are also providing IED awareness training to the country's infantry forces.

2016

Bodo bombings
On 25 January, four Boko Haram suicide bombers killed over 30 people in Bodo, Far North, Cameroon.

Dalori, Dikwa and Maiduguri attacks
On 30 January, at least 86 people were killed by Boko Haram in Dalori, Borno. On 9 February, two young female suicide bombers killed at least 60 people at an internally displaced persons' camp in Dikwa, Borno. On 16 March, two female suicide bombers killed 22 people on the outskirts of Maiduguri.

Boko Haram-IS infighting and loss of territory
In March, Boko Haram was reported to have used islands in Lake Chad as bases.

As Boko Haram's power waned, Shekau's leadership was increasingly criticised among Boko Haram and ISIL's central command. These elements repeatedly attempted to convince Shekau to change his tactics or his extreme ideas (such as considering everyone an apostate who has not openly sided with him, including all Muslims). Shekau refused to budge, and openly disobeyed ISIL's "Caliph" Abu Bakr al-Baghdadi in regard to various matters. ISIL and parts of Boko Haram eventually came to the conclusion that this was no longer tolerable, whereupon Shekau was removed from his position as vali of ISIL's West Africa Province in August. Abu Musab al-Barnawi, a son of Boko Haram founder Mohammed Yusuf was appointed as his successor. This event resulted in an open split among the Nigerian insurgents. Shekau refused to accept his dismissal, rallied a large number of supporters and violently opposed Barnawi and ISIL's central command. In turn, Barnawi and those who were loyal to him declared Shekau's group Khawarij. The two insurgent factions subsequently became fully separate organizations, with Shekau's followers re-adopting their old name "Jamā'at Ahl as-Sunnah lid-Da'wah wa'l-Jihād" (outsiders refer to this faction as "Boko Haram"), whereas Barnawi's forces continued to operate as "Islamic State's West Africa Province" (ISWAP). The two groups are generally hostile and fight each other, though it is possible that they occasionally cooperate against their common enemies.

On 31 August, Major General Lucky Irabor stated that the militants now only controlled a few villages and towns near Lake Chad and in Sambisa Forest. He further stated that the military expected recapturing the final strongholds of the group within weeks. 
 
On 24 December, President Muhammadu Buhari said that Boko Haram had been ousted from their last stronghold in the Sambisa Forest, effectively reducing Boko Haram to an insurgent force. This victory left Boko Haram without any territorial holdings; however, Boko Haram still maintains an extensive ability to carry out attacks.

2017

On 7 January, a group of Boko Haram militants attacked a Nigerian Army base in Yobe, killing five soldiers. In response, the Nigerian Army launched retaliatory strikes and killed 15 militants.

On 17 January, a Nigerian Air Force jet mistakenly bombed an IDP camp near the Cameroonian border in Rann, Borno, mistaking it for a Boko Haram encampment. The airstrike left 115 people dead.

On 22 March, at least six people were killed and 16 wounded when four female suicide bombers blew themselves up on the outskirts of Maiduguri city.

On 22 March, the Nigerian Department of State Services (DSS) announced that a suspected member of Boko Haram had been arrested in northeastern Yobe State. The suspect confessed details of a plot to attack the American and British embassies, and other western targets in Abuja. The DSS also later announced that between 25 and 26 March, five suspected members of Boko Haram had been arrested, thus thwarting the plot.

On 2 April, the Nigerian military began what it said was its "final offensive" to retake Boko Haram's last strongholds.

On 17 May, the Nigerian Army reported that it had arrested about 126 suspected Boko Haram terrorists at the Internally Displaced Persons (IDPs) camp in Damboa, Borno.

In September, Boko Haram militants kidnapped about 40 young adults, women and children and killed 18 in the town of Banki, 130 km southeast of Maiduguri, Borno State, on the border of Nigeria and Cameroon. Boko Haram was reported to have killed 380 people between April and September in the Lake Chad area . About 57% of all schools in Borno state were closed due to the Boko Haram insurgency, affecting the education of about 3 million children.

On 21 November, a suicide bomber killed 50 people in a mosque in Mubi.

In December, fighters who were believed to belong to ISWAP attacked a patrol of US Army Special Forces and Nigerian soldiers in the Lake Chad Basin Region in Niger. The coalition troops managed to repel the assault without suffering any casualties.

2018
On 16 February, three suicide bombers killed about 20 people in Konduga.

On 19 February, Boko Haram kidnapped 110 schoolgirls from Dapchi, Yobe.

By March, two main insurgent factions were still active, and continued to wage an insurgency campaign against the government: The followers of Abubakar Shekau (Boko Haram) operated mainly in southern Borno, while the faction of Abu Musab al-Barnawi (ISWAP) was mostly located around Lake Chad.

On 26 April, Boko Haram bombers killed at least four civilians in the outskirts of Maiduguri, the largest city in Borno. A subsequent gun battle and tear gas launched by security forces repelled the attackers, but left two officers wounded and several others injured.

On 1 May, two suicide bombers killed dozens of people in Mubi.

On 15 July, hundreds of Nigerian soldiers went missing after ISWAP forces led by Abu Musab al-Barnawi overran a Nigerian Army base in the northeastern part of Nigeria. Less than 100 Nigerian soldiers returned after the attack, the attack came 24 hours after ISIL ambushed a military convoy in neighbouring Borno. The attack on the base resulted in a battle that lasted over an hour, it is unknown if there were any casualties in the assault, a local pro-government militia said the military had sustained some casualties, this attack marks Boko Haram's first major gain since 2015.

On 8 September, ISWAP fighters managed to capture the town of Gudumbali in central Borno, marking their first major gain in nearly two years. The next day, ISIL's West Africa Province released a video showing footage from combat with the Nigerian Army in the area. In late December, ISWAP launched another offensive and captured Baga in northeastern Borno State.

In November, fighting in and around Lake Chad intensified, beginning the Chad Basin campaign, which lasted until February 2020. On 18 November, ISWAP fighters attacked a military base in Metele, Borno, killing at least 118 soldiers while at least 153 others were missing after the attack, the militants also seized tanks, armored vehicles, artillery, weapons, and ammunition.

2019

Barnawi's ISWAP launched a major offensive in January, attacking several Nigerian military bases, including those at Magumeri and Gajiram. Insurgents also overran and destroyed the IDP town of Rann, displacing its inhabitants yet again. The destruction of Rann was initially attributed to ISWAP, but Shekau's Boko Haram later claimed responsibility.

Three Boko Haram suicide bombers killed 30 people in Konduga, Borno, on 16 June. Boko Haram shot dead at least 65 people in Nganzai, Borno, who were walking home from a funeral on 27 July.

2020
On 6 January, Boko Haram bombed a market in Gamboru, Borno, killing at least 38 people. On 9 February, they killed at least 30 people in Auno, Borno. On 23 March, they carried out massacres against the Chadian and Nigerian armies.

The Chadian Defense Minister, Mahamat Abali Salah, announced on 31 March the launch of “Operation Boma's Wrath”, in response to Boko the 23 March massacres. The operation's target is to wipe out the Boko Haram remnants around Lake Chad, the operation is named after the island where Boko Haram launched a seven-hour assault, that Chadian President Idriss Déby said, was the worst the country's military had ever suffered.

On 9 June, Boko Haram killed 81 villagers in a mass shooting in Gubio, Borno.

On 13 June, Boko Haram killed at least 20 soldiers in Monguno and more than 40 civilians in Nganzai.

On 29 July, convoy of the Borno governor, Babagana Zulum was attacked by Boko Haram. Five people were killed in fighting, including three policemen. Governor was not hurt.

On 2 August, Boko Haram killed at least 18 people in a grenade attack on an IDP camp in Far North, Cameroon.

On 9 August, ISWAP killed six French aid workers and two Nigerien civilians in Kouré, Tillabéri Region, Niger.

On 19 August, Islamic State militants took hundreds of people hostage in Borno.

On 6 September, Boko Haram raided a village of Kurmari, where they killed four civilians in their sleep. They also raided two villages at outskirts of Maiduguri, six civilians were killed in this raid.

Nigerian military carried out an operation against Boko Haram in Hamdaga Makaranta town in Gwoza local government area. Five insurgents were killed and seven hostages were rescued, several insurgents were wounded but managed to escape.

On 17 September, Boko Haram raided a village in Lake Chad region in Chad, several civilians were abducted.

On 18 September, Nigerian military carried out an air operation against Boko Haram in Kassa Kura in Maiduguri. Sixteen insurgents were killed, 38 were arrested, their ammunition was seized. Several insurgents escaped with wounds.

Boko Haram attacked Kassa in Far North region of Cameroon, killing two civilians. Local vigilante group tried to protect the civilians but were outnumbered by the insurgents, several were wounded during the fight.

On 19 September, Chadian military attacked Boko Haram in the village of Barkalam near the border with Nigeria, 15 Boko Haram fighters were killed in the fighting, 12 hostages were rescued. Boko Haram and Chadian military later clashed at Bilabrim where five insurgents were killed and two Chadian soldiers were wounded.

On 20 September, Boko Haram ambushed a military convoy, killing 3 soldiers at the place and fatally wounding Colonel Dahiru Bako.

On 25 September, Boko Haram ambushed a military convoy accompanying government officials near Monguno town, killing 15; Eight policemen, three soldiers, and four Civilian Joint Task Force members.

On 26 September, Babagana Zulum and his convoy were attacked by Boko Haram near Baga. Zulum was unhurt but 30 people were killed in the attack; twelve policemen, five soldiers, four members of a government-backed militia and nine civilians. Many others were injured.

On 27 September, Islamic State militants attacked a convoy in Borno, killing 18 people.

On 29 September, Babagana Zulum's convoy noticed a donkey on the road and shot at it. After the donkey exploded, insurgents who planted a bomb on it came out of hiding and fired at them. Several of Boko Haram insurgents were killed in following shootout, while no one from Zulum's convoy was injured or killed. Vehicles of the convoy sustained bullet damage.

On 1 November, Boko Haram raided Takulashi village near Chibok; they came from Sambisa Forest. Anti-jihadist militia from Chibok mobilised in two trucks and attempted to defend the village but were outnumbered by insurgents who managed to seize one of their trucks. Twelve people were killed and seven civilians abducted.

On 9 November, Nigerian military carried out two operations against Boko Haram. In village of Buni Gari 5 Boko Haram insurgents were killed and several others were injured. Nigerian military also rescued four hostages held by Boko Haram in another operation.

On 21 November, Boko Haram ambushed a Nigerian military convoy between Jagiran and Monguno. Six soldiers were killed and 26 were injured in an ambush, several soldiers also went missing.

On 22 November, Convoy belonging to governor of Borno, Babagana Zulum was attacked while he was traveling to meet with government officials in Baga. Seven soldiers and two civilians were killed in this ambush, but the governor was unhurt. His appointment was cancelled.

On 26 November, Boko Haram staged an attack on mainly Christian village of Gabass in Far North, Cameroon. Three civilians were killed and one was kidnapped. Boko Haram also attacked village of Guidi also in Far North region where they set five homes ablaze.

On 28 November, Boko Haram massacred about 110 farmers in Koshebe, Borno.

On 11 December, Boko Haram abducted more than 330 secondary school students in Kankara, Katsina State.

On 12 December, around 70 Boko Haram militants attacked village of Toumour in Niger at around 17:45 GMT. At least 27 people were killed, and several others are missing or wounded. During the attack between 800 and 1000 houses, the central market and various vehicles were burnt down. According to a local elected official nearly 60% of the village was destroyed by the attack which lasted 3 hours.

On 24 December, Boko Haram attacked the Christian village of Pemi in Borno. The attackers burnt 10 homes and looted food supplies that were meant to be distributed to residents to celebrate Christmas; they also took medical supplies from the village. Security officials warned that an attack on Christian holiday is likely, so many residents managed to escape the attack. Nevertheless 11 civilians were killed including a Christian priest.

Boko Haram kidnapped around 40 loggers in Wulgo forest; three loggers were killed while trying to escape. Loggers from the village of Shehuri in Borno went to the forest but the did not return on the evening as they usually do. Next day local anti-jihadist militia leader mobilised a search party which went deep into the forest and recovered three bodies.

On 26 December, Boko Haram raided villages of Shafa, Azare, and Tashan Alade in Borno. Ten people were killed during the raids, seven of them being civilians, two policemen, and one CJTF militiaman. Houses, shops, churches and one police station were burnt down during the raids.

On 28 December, A landmine planted by Boko Haram in Larothe Gomani village killed four Nigerian soldiers.

On 29 December, Seven hunters were killed and nine other were injured after their vehicle hit a landmine planted by Boko Haram near the village of Kayamla. They were recruited by the government to help fight against the jihadist groups, when their vehicle hit a landmine they were pursuing Boko Haram insurgents.

2021 
On 3 January, Multinational Joint Task Force carried a sweep around Kolofata, during the fighting three Boko Haram insurgents were killed and two were captured.

Operation Tuka Takaibango was announced by Nigeria's military.

On 4 January, at around 4 am three members of a local vigilance committee were shot dead by Boko Haram in Mayo Moskota area. A civilian was killed by Boko Haram in Kolofata area the same morning.

On 6 January, Boko Haram infiltrated in the town of Geidam, Yobe. Insurgents were sighted at outskirts of Geidam at 1 pm. A rumour about insurgents spread through town soon and it caused regular activities to be disrupted for an hour and a half, after nothing happened people continued with their regular activities. Boko Haram insurgents gathered at strategic locations such as Geidam market with a coordinated plan at 5:30 pm, soon after they positioned at those locations they attacked the town. The insurgents abducted the District Head, injured several civilians and stole food and medical supplies. Police of the district later found two bodies in a burnt vehicle who they believe are members of Boko Haram.

Troops of Nigerian 402 Special Forces Brigade clashed with elements of Boko Haram, according to The Chief of Training and Operations of the Nigerian Army, Nuhu Angbazo Boko Haram, suffered a heavy defeat.

On 7 January, Operation Tuka Takaibango was officially launched.

On 8 January, Boko Haram attacked village of Mozogo in Cameroon, many civilians tried to escape into a nearby forest. A female suicide bomber detonated herself during the attack, killing at least 14 civilians eight of those being children.

On 9 January, At least 28 Boko Haram insurgents were killed during clashes with Nigerian Army in Gujba, while several other insurgents escaped, one Nigerian soldier was killed and one was injured, according to military spokesman of Nigeria.

On 11 January, ISWAP ambushed Nigerian military convoy in Gazagana village, killing 13 and injuring several others.

On 13 January, an ISWAP suicide bomber killed six Nigerian soldiers as they conducted a raid in the village of Talala, Borno.

On 14 January, ISWAP militants attacked Garin Gada village in Yobe, killing at least two civilians, whilst also raiding and looting food from the village.

On 17 January, seven IEDs were activated against a Nigerian Army convoy of APCs and other vehicles, escorted by a foot patrol in Gorgi, Borno. Over 30 soldiers were killed. Three vehicles were destroyed, and an armored vehicle, weapons and ammunition were seized.

On 18 January, ISIS operatives exchanged fire and activated several IEDs against Nigerian soldiers in Matari, about 50 km west of Maiduguri, the capital of Borno State. At least 20 soldiers were killed. Two ATVs were destroyed. In addition, two ATVs, an APC, weapons and ammunition were seized.

On 22 January, IS operatives ambushed and fired machine guns at a Nigerian Army patrol in Borno. Seven soldiers were killed and others were wounded. In addition, an ATV, weapons and ammunition were seized.

On 31 January, two attacks took place in northern Nigeria. One in the village of Chabal, leaving two policemen dead and two abducted. The second attack occurred in Dikwa, resulting in the deaths of 2 soldiers and leaving two female police officers abducted.

On 5 February, it was reported that Nigerian troops backed by jets overran several camps of Boko Haram in the Timbuktu triangle, including the Dole camp. They also liberated Talala, which was seized in 2013 by militants and became their second largest camp, right behind the Lake Chad region. Besides Talala they also liberated Buk, Gorgi and overran camps in Kidari, Argude, Takwala, Chowalta and Galdekore. Two high-profile ISWAP commanders, Modu Sulum and Ameer Modu Borzogo, fled along with some fighters during intense fighting but several other commanders and fighters have been killed and many abducted hostages were rescued.

On 5 February, ISWAP operatives ambushed Nigerian soldiers in the Goniri region, near the Niger-Nigeria border. The two sides exchanged fire. Six soldiers were killed and a few others were wounded. The other soldiers fled. ISIS operatives seized vehicles, weapons and ammunition.

On 7 February, 'bandits' raided two villages in northwest Nigeria's Kaduna State, leading to the deaths of 19 people, according to the Nigerian government.

On 8 February, ISWAP operatives attacked a Nigerian Army checkpoint in Monguno, about 70 km from the Nigeria-Chad-Cameroon tri-border area. There was an exchange of fire. Three soldiers were killed and several others were wounded. ISIS operatives seized vehicles, weapons and ammunition.

On 9 February, a group of Nigerian soldiers was attacked between Jakana and Mainok, about 30 km west of Maiduguri. There was an exchange of fire. Seven soldiers were killed. In addition, two Nigerian Army vehicles were destroyed. ISIS operatives seized weapons left at the site.

On February 9, a Nigerian Army checkpoint was attacked in Geidam, Yobe, about 30 km from the Nigeria-Niger border. The sides exchanged fire. Four soldiers were killed, three were taken prisoner and the rest fled. ISIS operatives seized weapons left at the site and set fire to a Nigerian army vehicle.

On 11 February, Nigerian soldiers were ambushed in the suburbs of Monguno. An IED was activated against the soldiers, followed by an exchange of fire. Three soldiers were killed and several others were wounded. The rest fled. ISWAP operatives seized an ATV and weapons.

On 12 February, a force of a militia supporting the Nigerian Army was attacked in the village of Gur, about 150 km south of Maiduguri in northeastern Nigeria. There was an exchange of fire. Four militia fighters were killed. The ISWAP operatives set fire to four vehicles and houses belonging to the fighters.

On 15 February, a Nigerian Army compound was attacked in Marte, Borno, about 40 km east of the Nigeria-Cameroon border, in northeastern Nigeria. Ten soldiers were killed in the exchange of fire and several others were wounded. The other soldiers fled. ISIS operatives set fire to the compound, two tanks and a Nigerian army vehicle. They also seized three vehicles, weapons and ammunition.

On 16 February, a group of Nigerian soldiers was attacked in a village in Borno. There was an exchange of fire. Four soldiers were killed and several others were wounded. The other soldiers fled. ISIS operatives seized weapons and ammunition.

Four policemen and seven civilians were killed during an ISWAP attack on the village of Bayamari village in Yobe.

An attack was carried out against the headquarters of a militia supporting the Nigerian Army in Gubio, Borno. There was an exchange of fire. Three soldiers were killed and several others were wounded. The other soldiers fled. ISIS operatives seized weapons and ammunition and set fire to vehicles.

On 17 February, a Nigerian Army convoy was ambushed and targeted by gunfire in the Karito region, near Lake Chad. Three soldiers were killed and several others were wounded in the exchange of fire. ISWAP operatives seized weapons and ammunition, and set fire to three vehicles.

On 19 February, an attack was carried out against a Nigerian Army camp in Dikwa, about 50 km from the Nigeria-Cameroon border in Borno State. A total of 15 soldiers were killed in the exchange of fire and several others were wounded. The remaining soldiers fled, and ISWAP operatives seized four vehicles, weapons and ammunition. ISIS operatives set fire to the camp and to other vehicles. The camp taken over by ISWAP operatives is one of the largest Nigerian Army camps and that many residents left the area in the wake of the attack.

On 21 February, Boko Haram militants beheaded five people in an IDP camp in Borno.

On 23 February, Boko Haram militants stormed Maiduguri, killing at 10 people, firing rocket-propelled grenades in the city. This is the first attack of its kind there in years.

On 25 February, Gunmen on motorcycles stormed into several villages in Igabi and Chikun districts of Kaduna State, leaving at least 18 people dead.

On 26 February, a midnight attack on a secondary school in Zamfara resulted in at least 279 schoolgirls being kidnapped.

On 28 February, ISWAP ambushed the convoy of the Commandant of Nigeria's counterinsurgency operation, Farouq Yahaya, killing at least two soldiers.

On 1 March, ISWAP took over the town of Dikwa for several hours after forcing government forces out of the settlement. Whilst in Dikwa, the militants attacked a Nigerian Army base killing six soldiers. The returned the next day killing another two soldiers.

ISWAP took over the town of Bukarti, Yobe. IS militants also attacked a Nigerian Army convoy near Geidam, Yobe. The attack left two Nigerian soldiers dead.

On 6 March, Boko Haram invaded Rumirgo community of Askira Uba local government area of Borno, killing two civilians and a security personnel and stole a tanker vehicle loaded with petrol.

On 25 April, 31 Nigerian soldiers were killed in Mainok, Borno.

On 19 – 20 May, ISWAP attacked and overran Boko Haram militants in the Sambisa Forest, Borno, and eventually captured the forest. The leader of Boko Haram Abubakar Shekau was killed during the fighting, reportedly using a suicide vest. The remaining Boko Haram loyalists rallied under Bakura Sahalaba who declared that they were not yet defeated.

On 24 June, the United Nations Development Program released a report saying that the insurgency in Nigeria, as of the end of 2020, had killed around 350,000 people, by direct and indirect means.

On 4 July, ISWAP named new commanders and governors, including personnel in charge of taxation.

On 29 October it was reported that Nigeria's army it had killed the new leader of ISWAP, Malam Bako, in a military operation this month, two weeks after announcing the death of the group's former head Abu Musab al-Barnawi.

On 6 November, non-IS sources claimed that ISWAP had elected Sani Shuwaram as new leading commander.

On 13 November, Nigerian Army Brigadier General Dzarma Zirkusu and three other Nigerian soldiers were killed in an ISWAP attack on Askira town in Borno State.

On 30 December, the Multinational Joint Task Force (MTJF) announced that six troops from Nigeria and Niger were killed and 16 wounded by ISWAP militants during an operation in December 2021 in Borno State. In the same operation, 22 militants were killed and 17 captured.

2022 

On 18 February it was reported that Nigerian aircraft eliminated some terrorist kingpins including ISWAP Commander Mallam Buba Danfulani during a raid on Boko Haram/ISWAP terrorist's strongholds around the Tumbuns area in Lake Chad and Sambisa Forests surroundings. Five other commanders by the names of: Musa Amir Jaish, Mahd Maluma, Abu-Ubaida, Abu-Hamza and Abu-Nura umarun Leni were also killed.

In May Abubakar Sarki a top Boko Haram leader and some of his troops were killed in the Sambisa Forest by the Nigerian army.

On March 20 the new leader of ISWAP, Sani Shuwaram, and other terrorists were killed after airstrikes hit some terrorist camps. Shortly after reports emerged that Bako George is going to replace him.

On May 14 it was reported that MNJTF airstrikes killed two prominent ISWAP leaders, Bako Gorgore and Aba-Ibrahim in Lake Chad.

On May 16 radical preacher and leader of Jamā’at Ahl as-Sunnah lid-Da’wah wa’l-Jihād, Alhaji Ari-Difinoma has surrendered to Nigerian troops.

On May 23 Boko Haram fighters killed around 40 farmers.

On May 30 The MNJTF troops from Nigeria and Chad, alongside Operation HADIN KAI, stormed the general area of Tumbun Rago, Tumbun Dilla and Jamina settlements and succeeded in eliminating over 25 terrorists. The troops also recovered one AK-47 rifle, one anti-aircraft gun, and hundreds of assorted ammunition.
A group of hunters ambushed and killed a Boko Haram commander and his deputy while wounding several of their escaping fighters.

On 9 April ISWAP commander Abubakar Dan-Buduma and other terrorists were killed in Operations by the MNJTF.

On 1 June A rivalry clash between ISWAP and the Jamā’at Ahl as-Sunnah lid-Da’wah wa’l-Jihād, has led to the killing of a commander by the name Ummate Ma, and scores of his fighters.

On 5 June members of the Islamic State West Africa Province (ISWAP) attacked St Francis Xavier Catholic Church in Owo town in Ondo State, Nigeria, (located 345 kilometres (215 miles) east of Lagos) killing at least 50 parishioners and injuring a further 87 congregants.

On 7 June it was reported that the MNJTF said it killed 805 jihadis on Lake Chad's islands and neighboring areas between March 28 and June 4.

On 3 August it was reported that military airstrikes killed Boko Haram commander, Alhaji Modu and 27 other terrorists on Mandara Mountain in Gwoza local government area of Borno State.

On 10 August it was reported that bombardments by two Nigerian Air Force fighter jets have killed many terrorists, among them a terrorist leader, operating in Kaduna State, Alhaji Shanono. According to a military source, the terrorist were caught off guard during a battle between ISWAP and Boko Haram.

On 6 August Abdulkarim Faca-Faca, who was among the masterminds of the attack on President Muhammadu Buhari's advance convoy to Katsina, has been killed along with eight of his gang members by air strikes.

On 16 August The Chadian army said it killed ten Boko Haram terrorists during clashes around Bol in the Lake Chad area.

On 23 August troops of the Nigerian Air Force have bombarded the enclave of an ISWAP leader, Fiya Ba Yuram, in the Sambisa forest. The airstrikes hit some specific targets in the Tunbuns and Sambisa, reportedly killing scores of terrorists hiding in the enclaves.

On 26 August it was reported that terrorists commander Uzaifa, was killes in an air raid on criminal enclaves in Sambisa Forest and the Tumbuns in Borno State.

Between 30 and 31 August Nigerian fighter jets reportedly kill 49 Boko Haram fighters in separate camps.

On 1 September 70 suspected Boko Haram members have drowned in a river while trying to escape air bombardment in Sheruri village, Borno state.

On 5 September it was reported that Nigerian troops and aircraft killed 200 Boko Haram terrorists including five commanders by the names of Abou Hauwa, Amir Shettima, Akura Buri, Abou Zainab and Abou Idris.

On September 12 top Boko Haram commander and chief executioner, Bashir Bulabuduwaye, has surrendered to the Nigerian army.

On November 23, dozens of soldiers were reportedly killed near Lake Chad.

Other issues

Possible causes
The North consisted of Sahelian states that had long Islamic character. These were feudal and conservative, with rigid caste and class systems and large slave populations. Furthermore, the North failed until 1936 to outlaw slavery. Possibly due to geographical factors, many (but not necessarily all) southern tribes, particularly those on the coast, had made contact with Europeans – unlike the North, which was engaged mainly with the Arab world and not Europe. Due to the system of indirect rule, the British were happy to pursue a limited course of engagement with the Emirs. The traditionalist Northern elites were skeptical of Western education; at the same time their Southern counterparts often sent their sons abroad to study. In time, a considerable developmental and educational gap grew between the South and the North. Even in 2014, Northern states still lagged behind in literacy, school attendance and educational achievement.

Chris Kwaja, a Nigerian university lecturer and researcher, asserted in 2011 that "religious dimensions of the conflict have been misconstrued as the primary driver of violence when, in fact, disenfranchisement and inequality are the root causes". Nigeria, he pointed out, has laws giving regional political leaders the power to qualify people as 'indigenes' (original inhabitants) or not. It determines whether citizens can participate in politics, own land, obtain a job, or attend school. The system is abused widely to ensure political support and to exclude others. Muslims have been denied indigene-ship certificates disproportionately often.

Nigerian opposition leader Buba Galadima said in 2012: "What is really a group engaged in class warfare is being portrayed in government propaganda as terrorists in order to win counter-terrorism assistance from the West."

Human rights

The conflict has seen numerous human rights abuses conducted by the Nigerian security forces, in an effort to control the violence,
 as well as their encouragement of the formation of numerous vigilante groups (for example, the Civilian Joint Task Force).

Amnesty International accused the Nigerian government of human rights abuses after 950 suspected Boko Harām militants died in detention facilities run by Nigeria's military Joint Task Force in the first half of 2013. As of early 2016, according to Amnesty International, at least 8,000 detainees have died in detention facilities operated by the security services. Furthermore, the Nigerian government has been accused of incompetence and supplying misinformation about events in more remote areas.

Boko Haram has kidnapped large numbers of children on several occasions. This has led to Boko Haram members physically, psychologically and sexually abusing them, using and selling them as sex slaves and/or brides of forced marriages with their fighters. – the most famous example being the Chibok kidnapping in 2014. In addition to kidnapping child brides, Human Rights Watch has stated that Boko Haram uses child soldiers, including 12-year-olds. According to an anonymous source working on peace talks with the group, up to 40 percent of the fighters in the group are underage soldiers. The group has forcibly converted non-Muslims to Islam, and is also known to assign non-Kanuris on suicide missions.

Rehabilitation of insurgents 
A major problem faced by local governments is the rehabilitation of captured or surrendered militants, as these are generally suspected by officials and civilians to still hold connections to the rebels and pose a security risk. As result, ex-rebels are often ostracized, which in turn increases the risk of them rejoining the insurgency. Cameroon has planned to construct rehab centers for Boko Haram fighters which are supposed to teach them useful skills to get jobs, and to de-radicalise them. As of February 2019, however, no rehab centers for Boko Haram insurgents had been built yet in Cameroon due to lack of funding.

International context

The insurgence can be seen in the context of other conflicts nearby, for example in the North of Mali. The Boko Harām leadership has international connections to Al-Qaeda in the Islamic Maghreb, Al-Shabaab, the Movement for Unity and Jihad in West Africa (MUJAO), Mokhtar Belmokhtar's factions, and other militant groups outside Nigeria. In 2014, Nigerian President, Goodluck Jonathan even went so far as calling Boko Harām "al-Qaeda in West Africa". By 2012, attacks by Nigerian Islamist militias on targets beyond Nigeria's borders were still limited, and should not be confused with the activities of other groups (for example, the responsibility of AQIM for most attacks in Niger). Despite this, there were concerns that conflict could spread to Nigeria's neighbours, especially Cameroon, where it existed at a relatively low level until 2014, subsequently escalating considerably. It should also be noted there are combatants from neighboring Chad and Niger. In 2015, Boko Haram swore allegiance to ISIL.

On 17 May 2014, the presidents of Benin, Chad, Cameroon, Nigeria and Niger met for a summit in Paris and agreed to combat Boko Harām on a coordinated basis, sharing in particular surveillance and intelligence gathering. Goodluck Jonathan and Chadian counterpart, Idriss Deby have both declared total war on Boko Harām. Western nations, including Britain, France, Israel, and the United States had also pledged support including technical expertise and training. The New York Times reported in March 2015 that hundreds of private military contractors from South Africa and other countries are playing a decisive role in Nigeria's military campaign, operating attack helicopters and armored personnel carriers and assisting in the planning of operations.

See also

 Al-Shabaab (militant group)
 Boko Haram
 Islamic State – West Africa Province
 Timeline of the Boko Haram insurgency
 Religious violence in Nigeria
 Christianity and Islam
 Christianity in Africa
 Islam in Africa
 Christianity in Nigeria
 Islam in Nigeria
 Islamic extremism in Northern Nigeria
 List of massacres in Nigeria
 Central African Republic Civil War
 Insurgency in the Maghreb (2002–present)
 Islamist insurgency in the Sahel
 Insurgency in Cabo Delgado
 Northern Mali conflict
 Sinai insurgency
 Somali Civil War
 List of conflicts in Africa
 List of designated terrorist groups
 List of Islamist terrorist attacks
 List of modern conflicts in the Middle East
 List of ongoing armed conflicts
 Islam and violence
 Islamic fundamentalism
 Islamism
 Islamic terrorism
 Religious terrorism
 Religious violence

Notes

References

Works cited

 
, Democratization and Islamic Law: The Sharia Conflict in Nigeria (Frankfurt am Main 2008). Campus Verlag.

Further reading
 Comolli, Virginia. Boko Haram: Nigeria's Islamist Insurgency (Hurst, 2018) online review

External links
 
 Boko Haram Fighting for their Last Territorial Stronghold, 23 April 2015
 Blench, R. M., Daniel, P. & Hassan, Umaru (2003): Access rights and conflict over common pool resources in three states in Nigeria. Report to Conflict Resolution Unit, World Bank (extracted section on Jos Plateau)
 Understanding the Islamist insurgency in Nigeria, 23 May 2014 by Kirthi Jayakumar.
 Muslims should unite to fight Boko Haram Insurgency – Sultan, 30 November 2014

 
 
Politics of Northern Nigeria
Politics of Nigeria
Sharia in Nigeria
Islamic extremism in Northern Nigeria
Wars involving Nigeria
Wars involving Cameroon
Wars involving Chad
Wars involving Niger
Religion-based civil wars
Conflicts in 2009
Conflicts in 2010
Conflicts in 2011
Conflicts in 2012
Conflicts in 2013
Conflicts in 2014
Conflicts in 2015
Conflicts in 2016
Conflicts in 2017
Conflicts in 2018
Conflicts in 2019
Conflicts in 2020
Conflicts in 2021
Islamic State of Iraq and the Levant in Nigeria
Wars involving the Islamic State of Iraq and the Levant
Rebellions in Nigeria
Insurgencies in Africa
Terrorism in Nigeria